Christian Vicente Fernandez Noel (17 November 1937 – 26 November 2017) was a Filipino Roman Catholic prelate.

Born in Asturias, Cebu, Noel was ordained to the priesthood in 1961. He served as the Bishop of Talibon from 1986 until his retirement in 2014. He died on 26 November 2017 in Cebu City, nine days after his 80th birthday.

References

External links
 Christian Vicente Noel at Catholic-Hierarchy.org 

1937 births
2017 deaths
20th-century Roman Catholic bishops in the Philippines
21st-century Roman Catholic bishops in the Philippines
People from Cebu